Peter B. K. Ng (born 27 August 1947) is currently the longest serving horse trainer in Hong Kong. He takes out his own licence in 1983/84. He trained 17 winners in 2010/11 for an overall total of 402.

Significant horses
Mystic
Quicken Away
Reliable Source

Performance

References
The Hong Kong Jockey Club 

Hong Kong horse trainers
Living people
1947 births